Pauanui Aerodrome  is a small aerodrome located in the middle of the Pauanui Beach township on the Coromandel Peninsula of the North Island of New Zealand.

Operational information 
 Runway strength: ESWL 1270

The aerodrome is next to the golf course, and is lined with beach houses, some of which have a hangar as the lower floor and most of which have aircraft tie-down points in the yard.

The surface is grass on sand and usable even in wet weather. There are no clubrooms or fuel available, but the Pauanui Village centre with cafes and other facilities is a 500m walk to the south west.

There is a surf beach at the eastern end of the runway, and an estuary beach with calmer conditions to the western end. Pauanui is a popular destination for light aircraft flying in for a swim or lunch at the cafes.

References 
NZAIP Volume 4 AD
New Zealand AIP (PDF)

Airports in New Zealand
Thames-Coromandel District
Transport in Waikato
Transport buildings and structures in Waikato